Anna Kozyupa (born 7 March 1995) is a Belarusian football defender currently playing for Split.

International goals

References

External links 
 

1995 births
Living people
Belarusian women's footballers
FC Minsk (women) players
Women's association football defenders
Belarus women's international footballers
Sportspeople from Brest, Belarus